Abelino Manuel Apeleo is a Chilean Anglican bishop. Previously the Auxiliary Bishop of Araucanía, since 2018 he has been Bishop of Temuco in the 40th Province of the Anglican Communion, namely the Anglican Church of Chile.

References

21st-century Anglican bishops in South America
Living people
Chilean Anglicans
Anglican bishops of Temuco
Year of birth missing (living people)